Jerome Allan Hertaus (born July 8, 1952) is a Minnesota politician and member of the Minnesota House of Representatives. A member of the Republican Party of Minnesota, he represents District 33A in the western Twin Cities metropolitan area.

Education
Hertaus graduated from St. Louis Park High School. He attended the University of Minnesota and North Hennepin Community College. He later attended and graduated from St. Mary's College.

Minnesota House of Representatives
Hertaus was first elected to the Minnesota House of Representatives in 2012.

Personal life
Hertaus is married to his wife, Sharon. They have three children and reside in Greenfield, Minnesota, where he served as mayor.

References

External links

Rep. Jerry Hertaus official Minnesota House of Representatives website
Rep. Jerry Hertaus official campaign website

1952 births
Living people
Republican Party members of the Minnesota House of Representatives
21st-century American politicians
People from Shakopee, Minnesota